Waiuku AFC is an amateur football club in New Zealand.

While the highest they have played in local competition is NRFL Division 1, they have played in the Chatham Cup, New Zealand's premier knock out tournament a number of times. Their best appearances in the cup was in 2008 and 2015 where they made it to the third round.

References

External links
Ultimate New Zealand Soccer Waiuku's Page
Club website

Association football clubs in New Zealand